The Invisible Children is a 2001 Colombian drama film directed by Lisandro Duque Naranjo. It was selected as the Colombian entry for the Best Foreign Language Film at the 75th Academy Awards, but it was not nominated.

Cast
 Guillermo Castañeda as Rafael
 Ingrid Cielo Ospina as Martha Cecilia
 Gustavo Angarita as Fernando

See also
 List of submissions to the 75th Academy Awards for Best Foreign Language Film
 List of Colombian submissions for the Academy Award for Best Foreign Language Film

References

External links
 

2001 films
2001 drama films
Colombian drama films
2000s Spanish-language films